Tolbuzino is a rural locality (a selo) and the administrative center of Talbuzinskoye Rural Settlement of Magdagachinsky District, Amur Oblast, Russia. The population was 178 as of 2018. There are 2 streets.

Geography 
Tolbuzino is located 50 km southwest of Magdagachi (the district's administrative centre) by road. Magdagachi is the nearest rural locality.

References 

Rural localities in Magdagachinsky District